Patan is one of the 182 Legislative Assembly constituencies of Gujarat state in India. It is part of Patan district and a segment of Patan Lok Sabha constituency. It is numbered as 18-Patan.

List of segments

This assembly seat represents the following segments,

 Patan Taluka (Part) Villages – Melusan, Golivada, Volavi, Jamtha, Kansa, Bhutiya Vasna, Deliyathara, Vayad, Ghacheli, Dharusan, Dhanasara, Rakhav, Kalodhi, Vadiya, Lodhi, Sotavad, Sampra, Undra, Sariyad, Veloda (Nana-Mota), Nayta, Balva, Vaghasar, Bepadar, Khanpurda, Vareda, Odhva, Khalipur, Rughnathpura, Nava Bavahaji, Sujnipur, Tankvasna, Aghar, Gulvasna, Lodhpur, Kuntavada, Ajimana, Sagodiya, Jaleshvar Paldi, Samalpati, Matarvadi, Anavada, Hanumanpura, Dudharampura, Dharnoj, Bhadrada, Fulesana, Badipur, Vadli, Bakratpur, Gungdipati, Hansapur, Runi, Hajipur, Kamlivada, Diodarda, Der, Chadasana, Nana Ramanda, Mota Ramanda, Santi, Dharpur, Dighdi, Ambliyasan, Khanpur Kodi, Mandotri, Borsan, Golapur, Sandesarpati, Kharivavdi, Manpur, Khanpur Rajkuva, Chandrumana, Bhalgam, Kungher, Ilampur, Sabosan, Katpur, Rajpur, Gadosan, Gaja, Norta, Sarva, Kuder, Balisana, Derasana, Kani, Visal-Vasna, Babasana, Samoda, Hamidpur, Mahemadpur, Mithivavdi, Khimiyana, Sankhari, Sardarpur Norta (Ambapara), Ranunj, Sander, Matpur, Ruvavi, Dabhdi, Manund, Patan (M).

Members of Vidhan Sabha

Election results

2022

2017

2012

1975 Vidhan Sabha Elections
 Amin, Bhagwandas Narandas (BJS) : 24,240 votes
 Patel Bhudarbhai Chhganbhai (INC) : 17,096

See also
 List of constituencies of the Gujarat Legislative Assembly
 Patan district

References

External links
 

Assembly constituencies of Gujarat
Patan district